The Penske PC3 was a Formula One car used by Citibank Team Penske during the 1976 Formula One season, It was designed by Geoff Ferris.

Development
In 1976 Penske signed a sponsorship deal with Citibank and built a new car, the Penske PC3. Northern Irish driver John Watson was signed to drive the car. which retained some of the design features from its predecessors, the Penske PC1, and the March 751. The PC3 was a development of the March 751 and bore a close resemblance to it. In total, two cars were constructed with one being driven by Watson.

Racing history

Citibank Team Penske

1975
Penske fielded the brand new PC3 for Watson in the final race of the 1975 season. The United States Grand Prix, Watson used the car in practice, but due to a technical failure was forced to switch to the old PC1, which was in the paddock as a demonstrator, for the race. He finished in ninth position, but his performance earned him a full-time Penske F1 drive for 1976.

1976

The first race of the 1976 season was the Brazilian Grand Prix, Watson retired when a fuel system failure turned into a fire. and finished fifth at South Africa. Watson was eleven laps down and not classified at the United States Grand Prix West and retired at Spain with engine failure, Watson finished seventh at the Belgian Grand Prix and tenth at Monaco. The PC3 was not as good as had been hoped and in the midseason Penske produced a new Penske PC4 from the Swedish Grand Prix onwards.

The Penske team scored 20 World Championship points in 1976, two with the PC3 and 18 with the PC4. Earning them fifth place in the Constructors' Championship.

F&S Properties

F&S Properties bought a PC3 from Penske and entered Dutchman Boy Hayje for his home race, the 1976 Dutch Grand Prix but he retired with a broken halfshaft.

Complete Formula One World Championship results
(key)

 All points scored in 1975 with the Penske PC1.   18 points scored in 1976 with the Penske PC4.   1 point scored in 1977 with the Penske PC4.

Non-Championship results 
(key)

References

Penske Formula One cars